Georgia Constitutional Amendment 1 of 2004, is an amendment to the Georgia Constitution that previously made it unconstitutional for the state to recognize or perform same-sex marriages or civil unions. The referendum was approved by 76% of the voters.

The text of the amendment states:
(a) This state shall recognize as marriage only the union of man and woman. Marriages between persons of the same sex are prohibited in this state.
(b) No union between persons of the same sex shall be recognized by this state as entitled to the benefits of marriage. This state shall not give effect to any public act, record, or judicial proceeding of any other state or jurisdiction respecting a relationship between persons of the same sex that is treated as a marriage under the laws of such other state or jurisdiction. The courts of this state shall have no jurisdiction to grant a divorce or separate maintenance with respect to any such relationship or otherwise to consider or rule on any of the parties' respective rights arising as a result of or in connection with such relationship.

The amendment was challenged in court. On May 16, 2006, a lower court in Georgia struck down the amendment, but on July 7, 2006, the Supreme Court of Georgia overturned the lower court thus leaving the amendment as part of the Georgia Constitution.

As a result of the Supreme Court ruling in Obergefell v. Hodges Amendment 1 was declared unconstitutional on June 26, 2015, legalizing same-sex marriage in Georgia.

Results

See also
LGBT rights in Georgia (U.S. state)

References

External links
 The Money Behind the 2004 Marriage Amendments -- National Institute on Money in State Politics

U.S. state constitutional amendments banning same-sex unions
2004 in LGBT history
LGBT in Georgia (U.S. state)
2004 Georgia (U.S. state) elections
2004 ballot measures
Georgia (U.S. state) ballot measures
Same-sex marriage ballot measures in the United States